Mandaean Australians are Australians of Mandaean descent or Mandaeans who have Australian citizenship.

Australia has the second-highest Mandaean population in the world, after Sweden.

Sydney metropolitan area
The Sydney metropolitan area in Australia has one of the largest Mandaean diaspora communities in the world. The community is centered in Greater Western Sydney suburbs such as Penrith and Liverpool. In Liverpool, the main mandi (Beth Manda) is the Ganzibra Dakhil Mandi. The Sabian Mandaean Association of Australia has purchased land by the banks of the Nepean River at Wallacia, New South Wales in order to build a new mandi. Another mandi in Sydney is the Yahya Yuhana Mandi.

Associations
The Sabian Mandaean Association in Australia is the largest Mandaean association in Australia. Religious affairs are managed by the Mandaean Synod of Australia.

Notable people
Salah Choheili, the current Rishama and head of the Mandaean community in Australia
Majid Fandi al-Mubaraki, a Mandaean living in Australia who has digitised many Mandaean texts using typesetted Mandaic script
Yuhana Nashmi, artist, photographer, writer, and archivist
Brikha Nasoraia, Mandaean priest, professor, and President of the International Mandaean Nasoraean Supreme Council and Nasoraean Mandaean Association

See also

Iraqi Australians
Iranian Australians
Assyrian Australians
Mandaean Americans
Mandaeans in Sweden
Mandaeans in Iraq (Arabic Wikipedia)

References

External links
Sabian Mandaean Association in Australia
Mandaean Synod of Australia
Australian Association for Mandaean Studies
Mandaean Youth Australia

Immigration to Australia
Mandaeans
Iranian Australian